Annapolis is an unincorporated community in Penn Township, Parke County, in the U.S. state of Indiana.

History
Annapolis was first settled in 1825 or 1826. It was platted on February 4, 1837, by settlers William Maris, Sr., and John Moulder. As of 1910, its population was about 200. It was probably named after Annapolis, Maryland. A post office was established at Annapolis in 1837, and remained in operation until 1905.

Geography
Its elevation is 646 feet.

References

Bibliography
 

Unincorporated communities in Indiana
Unincorporated communities in Parke County, Indiana